Marvel Fanfare was an anthology comic book series published by American company Marvel Comics. It was a showcase title featuring a variety of characters from the Marvel universe.

Volume one
Marvel Fanfare featured characters and settings from throughout the Marvel Universe, and it included stories of varying lengths by an array of creators. The title was published every two months and ran for 60 issues, cover dated from March 1982 to December 1991. It was edited throughout its run by Al Milgrom, who also wrote and drew an illustrated column, entitled "Editori-Al", in most issues. Marvel Fanfares original working title was Marvel Universe, which was later appropriated by Marvel editor-in-chief Jim Shooter for the encyclopedia series The Official Handbook of the Marvel Universe.

The series began with a Spider-Man/Angel team-up story by Chris Claremont and Michael Golden. Other Spider-Man appearances in the title included team-ups with the Scarlet Witch in issue #6 (Jan. 1983) and the Hulk in issue #47 (Nov. 1989). Several characters appeared in multiple issues including Doctor Strange, Weirdworld, the Warriors Three, the Black Knight, and Shanna the She-Devil. Writer Roger McKenzie wrote several stories for Marvel Fanfare including a two-part Iron Man vs. Doctor Octopus tale drawn by Ken Steacy. A Captain America backup story in issue #29 (Nov. 1986) featured early work by artist Norm Breyfogle.

Marvel Fanfare was envisioned as a showcase of the comics industry's best talent. Each issue featured 36 pages of material with no advertisements and it was printed on magazine-style slick  paper. It was more than twice as expensive as standard comic books ($1.25 in 1982 when most titles were 60 cents and $2.25 in 1991 when most were $1).

Editor Milgrom wrote of his experience with the series:

Inventory stories which saw publication in Marvel Fanfare include a comics adaptation of The Jungle Book in issues #8–11, the Black Widow serial in #10–13, the Hulk story in #29, and the Silver Surfer story by Steve Englehart and John Buscema in #51.

Stories in Volume 1

Volume two
Marvel Fanfare volume two was published monthly for six issues, dated September 1996 to February 1997. This version of the title was edited by James Felder.

Like the first volume, the title featured different creative teams in each issue and starred different characters from around the Marvel universe. However, the talent were mostly newcomers, the paper was cheap and it cost half the price of most other comics (99 cents when most comics cost $1.95).
 
The title features the early work of writer Joe Kelly and penciller Scott Kolins.

Stories in Volume 2

Collected editions
 X-Men: In the Savage Land collects Marvel Fanfare #1–4, 96 pages, June 1988, 
 Marvel Fanfare: Strange Tales collects Marvel Fanfare #1–7, 244 pages, April 2008, 
 The Jungle Book includes material from Marvel Fanfare #8–11, 64 pages, April 2007
 Black Widow: Web of Intrigue collects Marvel Fanfare #10–13, 176 pages, April 2010, 
 Thor: The Warriors Three collects Warriors Three stories from Marvel Fanfare #13 and #34–37, 136 pages, September 2010,   
 Doctor Strange & Doctor Doom: Triumph & Torment includes Namor the Sub-Mariner stories from  Marvel Fanfare #16 and #43, 160 pages, 2013,   
 Cloak & Dagger: Crime and Punishment includes Marvel Fanfare #19, 264 pages, June 2012,  
 Weirdworld includes Marvel Fanfare #24–26, 312 pages, April 2015, 
 The Incredible Hulk Visionaries — John Byrne includes the Hulk story from Marvel Fanfare #29, 208 pages, June 2008, 
 Essential Moon Knight vol. 3 includes Moon Knight stories from Marvel Fanfare #30 and 38–39, 528 pages, November 2009, 
 Essential Silver Surfer vol. 2 includes Marvel Fanfare #51, 600 pages, June 2007, 
 Women of Marvel: Celebrating Seven Decades includes Hellcat story from Marvel Fanfare #59, 1,160 pages, January 2011, 
 Uncanny X-Men Omnibus Volume 2 includes the Savage Land story from Marvel Fanfare #1–4, 912 pages, April 2014,

See also 
 Showcase

References

External links 
 

1982 comics debuts
1991 comics endings
1996 comics debuts
1997 comics endings
Comics anthologies
Comics by Chris Claremont
Comics by Doug Moench
Comics by George Pérez
Comics by Jim Starlin
Comics by John Byrne (comics)
Comics by Marv Wolfman
Comics by Steve Englehart
Defunct American comics
Marvel Comics titles